Eagle Peak Mendocino County is an American Viticultural Area located in Mendocino County, California and established on November 10, 2014, by the U.S. Department of Treasury's Alcohol and Tobacco Tax and Trade Bureau (TTB). It lies within the North Coast AVA  and takes its name from the nearby Eagle Peak summit covering the mountainous area situated in the California Coastal Range just west of the Redwood Valley AVA and east of  the V-shaped Mendocino AVA.

Terroir
Eagle Peak's steeply sloping terrain is significantly cooler than its neighbor, Redwood Valley, and the further eastern Potter Valley. It experiences more seasonal temperature variation than coastal AVAs with less fog. Persistent breezes of 5-10 MPH travel from the ocean through the Big River airflow corridor. The soils are well-drained since water doesn't stick around due to the slopes and shallow root depths because of hard subsoil, There is enough water-holding capacity to keep vines healthy from dormancy through fruit set, however,  some irrigation is required to usher the vines through to harvest.

Wine Industry
Pinot Noir grows best in Eagle Peak, as the temperature tends to be cooler than the inland valleys.  The area is home to only one winery, Masút Vineyards and Winery, founded by third generation vintners and Mendocino-born Ben and Jake Fetzer.  They submitted the Eagle Peak TTB appellation proposal to further define this little known, unique winegrowing area.

References

External links
 Eagle Peak: Mendocino County Wines

American Viticultural Areas
American Viticultural Areas of California
American Viticultural Areas of Mendocino County, California
2014 establishments in California